Ariazate (also spelled Aryzate or Aryazate, meaning "Child of an Iranian"), also known as Automa, was a Parthian queen consort as the wife of the Parthian monarch Gotarzes I. 

She was an Artaxiad princess of Armenia as the daughter of the Artaxiad king Tigranes the Great. 

According to Zoroastrian law, the king could marry several women, all of whom were normally given the Greek title “basilissa” (“queen”), as well as legitimate wives without a title and have sons considered legitimate with the palace slave women and Greek hetaira used to entertain in his banquets, but no hierarchy is known for the queen-wives. 

Ariazate was possibly the mother of Gotarze's son and successor Orodes I.

References

Sources 

 

 
 

2nd-century BC Iranian people
Armenian princesses
Artaxiad dynasty
Parthian queens